The Bailiwick of Jersey is a British Crown dependency, unitary state and parliamentary representative democracy and constitutional monarchy. The head of the civil administration and judiciary is the Bailiff Timothy Le Cocq, while the Chief Minister Kristina Moore is the head of government. The current monarch and head of state is King Charles III.

Legislative and executive power is vested in the States of Jersey, which is composed of the Assembly of States members (States Assembly, French: Assemblé des États). Elected States members appoint the Council of Ministers (including the Chief Minister and other Ministers), which is the decision-making body of the island's government, the Government of Jersey. 

Other powers are exercised by the Connétable and Parish Assembly in each of the twelve parishes.

As one of the Crown dependencies, Jersey is sovereign territory of the Crown, but is not part of the United Kingdom. Jersey can be best described as "neither a colony nor a conquest, but a peculiar and immediate dependency of the Crown." The island is part of the British Islands, a political term encompassing the United Kingdom and the Crown Dependencies. This island is for the most part self-governing, with its own independent legal, administrative and fiscal systems.

The link between the island and the monarchy, rather than through Parliament, has led to an effectively independent political development on the island. In medieval times, the island was treated as a possession of the King by the English government, rather than part of the English state.

History

Prior to English rule 

When Augustus Caesar divided Gaul into four provinces, Jersey was part of the province headquartered at Lyons.

In around 933, Duke William I (William Longsword), seized Jersey, which until then had been politically linked to Brittany, and it is likely that the pre-Norman form of government and way of life was replaced at this point. The island adopted the Norman law system, still the basis of Jersey law today.:19

A key part of the early administrative structure of Jersey was the fief. Alongside the parish, the fief provided a basic framework for rural life; the system began with the Norman system and largely remained similar to it. In Jersey, the dues, services and rents owed by tenants were extensive and often onerous. Jersey peasants retained a degree of freedom lost elsewhere, probably due to the insignificance of the island in the Duchy. More is known of the origins of the fief than of the parishes and early documents show that Jersey was thoroughly feudalised (the majority of the residents were tenants holding land from Seigneurs). The fief of St Ouen, the most senior fief in Jersey's feudal structure, was by 1135 in the hands of the de Carteret family. They held extensive lands in Carteret as well, but these were lost by them after King John's loss of Normandy, so they decided to settle on the island. Between the 12th and 20th centuries, there were an estimated 245 fiefs in Jersey, though not all simultaneously.

In 1066, the Duke William the Conqueror defeated Harold Godwinson at Hastings to become the King of England; however, he continued to rule his French possessions, including Jersey, as a separate entity, as fealty was owed to the King of France. This initial association of Jersey with England did not last long, as William split his possessions between his sons: Robert Curthose became Duke of Normandy and William Rufus gained the English Crown. William Rufus' son Henry I recaptured Normandy for England in 1106. The island was then part of the English King's realm (though still part of Normandy and France). Around 1142, it is recorded that Jersey was under the control of the Count of Anjou, who administered Normandy for the Duke.

Gorroic is an old spelling for Gorey, containing St Martin, St Saviour, Grouville and St Clement; Groceio could derive from de Gruchy, and contains St John, Trinity, St Lawrence and St Helier; and Crapoudoit, likely referring to the stream of St Peter's Valley, contains the remainder of the parishes in the West. By Norman times, the parish boundaries were firmly fixed and remain largely unchanged since. It was likely set in place due to the tithe system under Charlemagne, where each property must contribute to the church, so each property would have had to be established within a parish.:15

Establishment of self-government 

It is said, in tradition, that the island's autonomy derives from the Constitutions of King John, however this is disputed. Until King James II, successive English monarchs have then granted to Jersey by charter its certain privileges, likely to ensure the island's continued loyalty, accounting for its advantageous position at the boundary of the European continent. As John (and later Henry III) maintained his claim to the title as the rightful Duke of Normandy until 1259, the island's courts were originally established as Norman, not English territory (to use English law would de-legitimise the English Crown's claim to the ducal title), so are based upon traditional Norman laws and customs, such as the Coutumier de Normandie. Legislative power was vested in 12 jurats, the twelve "senior men" of the island. Along with the Bailiff, they would form the Royal Court, which determined all civil and criminal causes (except treason).

Most lords forfeited their insular land in favour of their French territory, but some remained, notably the de Carteret family of St Ouen. The old aristocracy gave way to a new one, with landowners drawn from royal officials, who soon came to think of themselves as islanders rather than Englishmen. This saw the firm establishment of the feudal system in Jersey, with fiefs headed by Seigneurs.:30 In the Treaty of Paris (1259), the King of France gave up claim to the Channel Islands. The claim was based upon his position as feudal overlord of the Duke of Normandy. The King of England gave up claim to mainland Normandy and therefore the Channel Islands were split from the rest of Normandy. The Channel Islands were never absorbed into the Kingdom of England and the island has had self-government since. In medieval times, the island was treated as a possession of the King by the English government, rather than part of the English state.

The administration of the island was handled by an insular government. The King appointed a Warden (later "Capitain" or "Governor", now the Lieutenant-Governor of Jersey), a position largely occupied with the defence of the island. From 1415 until the second half of the 15th century, the islands were governed by a Lord (or Lady).

The existing Norman customs and laws were allowed to continue and there was no attempt to introduce English law. The formerly split administrative system was replaced with a centralised legal system, of which the head was the King of England rather than the Duke of Normandy. The law was conducted through 12 jurats, constables and a bailiff. These titles have different meanings and duties to those in England. Any oppression by a bailiff or a warden was to be resolved locally or failing that, by appeal to the King who appointed commissioners to report on disputes. In the late 1270s, Jersey was given its own Bailiff and from the 1290s, the duties of Bailiff and Warden were separated. The (Sub-)Warden became responsible for taxation and defence, while the Bailiff became responsible for justice. While probably originally a temporary arrangement by Otto de Grandison, this became permanent and the foundation for Jersey's modern separation of Crown and justice. It also lessened the Warden's authority relative to the Bailiff, who had much more interaction with the community.

The role of the jurats when the King's court was mobile would have been preparatory work for the visit of the Justices in Eyre. It is unknown for how long the position of the jurats has existed, with some claiming the position dates to time immemorial. After the cessation of the visits of the Justices in Eyre (and with the frequent absence of the Warden), the Bailiff and jurats took on a much wider role, from jury to justice.:28

In 1341, in recognition of islanders' efforts during the war, King Edward III declared that Jerseymen should 'hold and retain all privileges, liberties, immunities and customs granted by our forebares'. This began the tradition of successive Monarchs devolving powers over the island to Islanders, giving them certain privileges and protecting the separation between the Channel Islands and the rest of their royal realm.

In 1462, the occupying French Governor de Brézé issued ordinances outlining the role of the Bailiff and the Jurats. It may well be during this occupation that the island saw the establishment of the States. Comte Maulevrier, who had led the invasion of the island, ordered the holding of an Assize in the island. Maulevrier confirmed the place of existing institutions, however created the requirement for Jurats to be chosen by Bailiffs, Jurats, Rectors and Constables. The earliest extant Act of the States dates from 1524.

In 1541, the Privy Council, which had recently given a seat to Calais, intended to give two seats in Parliament to Jersey. Seymour, the Lieutenant-Governor of the Island, wrote to the Jurats, instructing them to send two Burgesses for the isle. However, no further steps seemed to have been taken since the letter did not arrive in front of the States Assembly until the day the elected persons were required to arrive in London.:70

Division of powers between Governor and Bailiff 

Sir John Peyton became the Governor in 1603 after the death of Queen Elizabeth I. Peyton struggled with the Bailiff over converting the island from the dominant Calvinist religion to Anglicanism. In 1615, Jean Hérault was appointed Bailiff by the King, having been promised the role by Letters Patent in 1611. Peyton disputed this appointment, claiming it was the Governor's jurisdiction to appoint the Bailiff. Hérault asserted it was the King's jurisdiction to directly appoint the Bailiff. An Order in Council (dated 9 August 1615) sided with Hérault, which Hérault took to claim the Bailiff was the real head of government and the Governor was simply a military officer. To back his claims, he also cited that in the Norman administrative tradition, the Bailiffs had "noone above them except the Duke".

This dispute led to one of the most major turning points in Jersey's constitutional history, as the division of powers between the Governor and Bailiff were clearly demarcated. Though the Privy Council did not agree with Hérault's extreme position on the precedence of the Bailiff, on 18 February 1617 it declared that the "charge of military forces be wholly in the Governor, and the care of justice and civil affairs in the Bailiff." This secured for both the Bailiff and the States precedence over the Governor on justice and civil affairs, the constitutional precendent which limits the involvement of the Lieutenant-Governor in domestic affairs today.

Jersey Revolution: division of the legislature and judiciary 

During the late 17th century, the Governors and Bailiffs were generally absent - the Governor Henry Lumley never visited the island at all during his time in office and after the death of Sir Edouard de Carteret, no bailiff was appointed for five years. The eventual successor Charles de Carteret faced large opposition, especially from his own tenants in St. Ouen. A group of jurats complained to the Privy Council that de Carteret was absent and not well accustomed to the law and culture of the island. Charles attempted to oppose this by blocking sittings of the Jurats in court, claiming they could not sit since they were related to the plaintiff or defendant (which they most often were since everyone in Jersey was somehow related to one another). By 1750, the Bailiffship had de facto become a hereditary position in the de Carteret family. Absences of the de Carterets and all other high-ranking posts left Charles Lempière, the Lieutenant Bailiff, in effective full control over the island. Lempière was a Parliamentarian, but by temperament was autocratic. His family had significant power with a number of high-ranking roles in the island and he issued ordinances and quashed protest through his court.:195 Democratic representation was not present in the island's political system, with only wealthier men able to vote for Connétables, with those men filling the roles with their relatives.

 A revolt, known as the Corn Riots or the Jersey Revolution, occurred in 1769. They were centred around the balance of power between the island's parliament, the States, and the Royal Court, both of which had powers to create legislation. An anti-Seigneurial sentiment - opposition to the feudal economic system - also contributed to the popular revolt. The spark for the riots was a corn shortage, in part caused by corruption in the ruling classes, led by the Lieutenant Bailiff Charles Lemprière, whose style of rule was authoritarian. On 28 September 1769, men from the northern parishes marched into town and rioted, including breaking into the Royal Court in a threatening manner. The States retreated to Elizabeth Castle and called on the Privy Council for help under false pretences. The Council sent five companies of Royal Scots, who discovered the islanders' grievances.

The protestors demands include reductions in price of wheat and the abolition of certain, or all, Seigneurial privileges. In reaction, the Crown issued the Code of 1771, which attempted to separate the island's judiciary and legislature. After the petitions of Le Geyt, the English authorities instructed that peace and reform should be brought to the island. Bentinck became Lieutenant Governor and introduced important reforms. The Royal Court was no longer a lawmaking body and all legislative power was vested in the States. With the fixing in 1771 of the Code des Lois it was established that the States had a legislative monopoly, and the lawmaking powers of the Royal Court were removed (see quote below). The Code of 1771 laid down for the first time in one place the extant laws of Jersey.:199

Party politics: Magots and Charlots 

The late 18th century was the first time political parties in some form came into existence on the island. Jean Dumaresq was an early Liberal who called for democratic reforms (that the States should be democratically elected Deputies and should have vested in them executive power). Dumaresq is quoted as saying "we shall make these Seigneurs bite the dust". In 1776, he was elected as Connétable for St Peter.:200

The post-Napoleonic War period was a divisive period politically for the island. In 1821, there was an election for Jurat. The St Laurentine Laurelites (conservatives, the eventual name for the ) attacked the Inn in their village where Rose men (the progressive descendants of the ) were holding a meeting. They damaged the building and injured both the innkeeper and his wife. On election day in St Martin, the a number of Rose voters were attacked, after which most Rose men refrained from voting. Although the Rose candidate won overall, he faced a number of lawsuits over claims of voter fraud, so in the end the Laurel candidate George Bertram took office.:232

Anglicisation 

During the 19th century, the administration system, despite reform, still resembled a feudal system of governance. At the start of the century, Jersey had achieved a high degree of self-government through delegation of Crown powers to the States, though the Bailiff, Governor and Jurats were all still Crown appointees. During the century, Jersey's power structure shifted more and more from the Crown to the States, establishing Jersey as a near-independent state, however ultimate authority over the island shifted from the Crown to the British Parliament, aligning with the shift in the UK's politics towards a purely ceremonial monarchy. The Privy Council put pressure of the island to reform its institutions, in the belief these reforms should align the country with a more English model of government and law. In 1883, John Stuart Blackie recounted an Englishman's comment that only one thing was needed to make Jersey perfect, and that was "a full participation in the benefits of English law". However, the Lieutenant Governor at the time stated that the absence of English law was what had brought Jerseymen such prosperity.

Many locals blamed this push for reform on the island's new immigrants, who were unaccustomed to the island's distinct political and legal systems (although a major part of the mainstream reformer movement was in fact made of Jerseymen). Many English who had moved to the island discovered an alien environment, with unfamiliar laws (in a foreign language they could not understand) and no recourse to access the local power to counter them. The reformers of English heritage mostly came from the middle classes, and sought to further their own rights, not necessarily those of the working class. These Englishmen formed a pressure group known as the Civil Assembly of St Helier. This group was effectively split into two, one organised around Abraham Le Cras' hard-code English reformism and the other, a larger looser corpus of English reformists. The former was never representative of a significant proportion of the English community. One thing both shared however was a belief that the English systems were far superior to the historic Norman-based structures.

Abraham Le Cras was an outspoken new resident - though with Jersey heritage - opposed to Jersey's self-government. He not only thought Jersey should be integrated into England fully, but disputed the right of the States to even make its own laws. He is noted as saying, 'the States have no more power to make laws for Jersey than I have'. In 1840, he won a court case challenging the States' ability to naturalise people as citizens. The Privy Council determined that the long-standing precedent of the States doing so had been invalidated since Jersey had been ruled under civil law since 1771. In 1846, he persuaded the MP for Bath to push for a Parliamentary Committee to enquire into the law of Jersey, however HM Government instead promised a Royal Commission. The Commission advised the abolition of the Royal Court run by the Jurats and the replacement of it with three Crown-appointed judges and the introduction of a paid police force. Le Cras left the island to live in England in 1850.

In 1852, the island experienced somewhat of a constitutional crisis when the Privy Council issued three Orders in Council: establishing a police court, a petty debts court and a paid police force for St Helier. This sparked controversy locally, with claims that the move threatened Jersey's independence. Both parties united against the move and around 7000 islanders signing a petition. By 1854, the council had agreed to revoke the Orders, on the condition that the States passed most of the council's requirements. In 1856, further constitutional reform brought deputies into the States for the first time, with one deputy from each country parish and three from town.

The threats to Jersey's autonomy continued. In the 1860s, there was raised a threat of an intervention in the island's government by the British Parliament itself, in order to impose change on the island's structures.

Reforms of 1948 

After the Occupation, many islanders called for the reform and modernisation of the States: a poll by the JEP showed that only 88 of the 1,784 surveyed thought Rectors should stay in the States and a vast majority wanted the legislature and judiciary separated. The Jersey Democratic Movement campaigned for either the incorporation of the island as a county of England or at least the abolition of the States. The other political party to emerge during this period was the Progressive Party, consisting of some present States members, who opposed the JDM. In the 1945 Deputies' election, the Progressives won a landslide victory, giving a mandate for change. The franchise was extended to all British adults, previously voting rights in Jersey had only been to men and women over 30 according to property ownership. The largest reform came in the form of the 1948 States reform. Jurats were no longer States members and were to be elected by an Electoral College. It also introduced a retirement age for Jurats of 70. In all cases, the Bailiff shall be the judge of the law, and the Jurats the "judge of fact". The Jurats' role in the States was replaced by 12 senators, four of whom would retire every three years. The Church also lost most of its representation in the States, with the role of Rector being abolished and the number of Deputies increased to 28. The first senatorial election was brief. Each Senator was elected for either nine, six or three years depending on where they came in the polling list. Philip Le Feuvre topped the poll and was elected for nine years. On 8 December 1945 in the Deputies' election, Ivy Forster of the Progressive Party became the first woman to ever be elected to the States. Other notable successful candidates include John Le Marquand Jr. (whose father had recently been returned as Senator) and Cyril Le Marquand.

Constitution

Jersey has an unwritten constitution arising from the Treaty of Paris (1259). This peculiar political position has often been to the benefit of islanders. Until the 19th century, the island was generally able to be exempt from the harsher parts of Westminster legislation, while being included in favourable policies, such as protectionist economic policies. Over time, there have been calls for reforms to Jersey's constitution, such as the 2000 Clothier report.

Jersey has never been part of the United Kingdom or its predecessors, however it has been a dependency of the monarch of each of these states at their time of existence. The government in Westminster has played an important role in Jersey's lawmaking and political landscape. Since the island is linked with the monarch, not the UK Parliament, there is dispute over the competency of Parliament to legislate for the island without the States' consent. The Crown retains residual responsibility for the "good government" of the island and the UK Government has a "non-interventionist policy" to supervising the Bailiwick.

International relations 

The 1973 Kilbrandon Report stated that "In international law the United Kingdom Government is responsible for the Islands' international relations" and "also responsible for the defence of the Islands". 

The United Kingdom is responsible for Jersey's international relations as an aspect of the island's status as a Crown dependency. It is now normal practice for the UK to consult the Jersey government and seek their consent before entering into treaty obligations affecting the island.

Since 2000, Jersey's "external personality" has developed, recognised in the preamble to the States of Jersey Law 2005 which refers to "an increasing need for Jersey to participate in matters of international affairs". In 2007, the Chief Minister of Jersey and the UK government agreed an "International Identity Framework", setting out the modern relationship between the United Kingdom and Jersey. The United Kingdom now issues "Letters of Entrustment" to the Jersey government, which delegate power to Jersey to negotiate international agreements on its own behalf and sign treaties in Jersey's own name rather than through the United Kingdom. This development was "strongly supported" by the House of Commons Justice Committee in its March 2010 report on the Crown Dependencies. In January 2011 Senator Freddie Cohen was appointed as Assistant Chief Minister with responsibility for UK and International Relations (in effect, Jersey's first Foreign Minister). 
 
Jersey was neither a Member State nor an Associate Member of European Union. It did, however, have a relationship with the EU governed by Protocol 3 to the UK's Treaty of Accession in 1972.

In relation to the Council of Europe, Jersey – as a territory the United Kingdom is responsible for in international law– has been bound by the European Convention on Human Rights since the UK acceded to the treaty in 1951. The Human Rights (Jersey) Law 2000 makes Convention rights part of Jersey law and is based closely on the United Kingdom's Human Rights Act 1998.

During the 1980s, the question of Jersey making an annual contribution towards the United Kingdom's costs of defence and international representation undertaken on behalf of Jersey was raised. In 1987, the States of Jersey made an interim payment of £8 million while the matter was discussed. The outcome of debates within the island was that the contribution should take the form of maintaining a Territorial Army unit in Jersey. The Jersey Field Squadron (Militia), attached to the Royal Monmouthshire Royal Engineers (Militia), deploys individuals on operations in support of British Forces.

The Crown 

As a Crown dependency, the head of state of Jersey is the British monarch and Jersey is a self-governing possession of the Crown. The present monarch, whose traditional title in the Channel Islands is the Duke of Normandy, is King Charles III. 

"The Crown" is defined by the Law Officers of the Crown as the "Crown in right of Jersey". The King's representative and adviser in the island is the Lieutenant Governor of Jersey, appointed for a five year term. He is a point of contact between Jersey ministers and the United Kingdom government and carries out executive functions in relation to immigration control, deportation, naturalisation and the issue of passports. Since 2017, the incumbent Lieutenant Governor has been Sir Stephen Dalton.

The Crown (not the government or parliament of Jersey) appoints the Lieutenant Governor, the Bailiff, Deputy Bailiff, Attorney General and Solicitor General. In practice, the process of appointment involves a panel in Jersey which selects a preferred candidate whose name is communicated to the UK Ministry of Justice for approval before a formal recommendation is made to the King.

Legislature 

 

The parliamentary body responsible for adopting legislation and scrutinising the Council of Ministers is the States Assembly. 49 elected members (37 Deputies and 12 Connétables) sit in the unicameral assembly. There are also five non-elected, non-voting members appointed by the Crown (the Bailiff, the Lieutenant Governor, the Dean of Jersey, the Attorney General and the Solicitor General).

Elections for Senators and Deputies occur at fixed four-yearly intervals, historically in October. From 2018, elections will be held in May every fourth year.

At a local level, the Connétables (or 'constables') are elected for four years. Other posts in parish municipalities vary in length from one to three years and elections take place at a Parish Assembly on a majority basis. It has been some time since parties contested elections at this level, other than for the position of Connétable who uniquely has a role in both the national assembly and in local government.

Decisions in the States are taken by majority vote of the elected members present and voting. The States of Jersey Law 2005 removed the Bailiff's a casting vote and the Lieutenant Governor's power of veto. Although formally organised party politics plays no role in the States of Jersey assembly, members often vote together in two main blocs – a minority of members, holding broadly progressive views and critical of the Council of Ministers versus a majority of members, of conservative ideology, who support the Council of Ministers.

Scrutiny panels of backbench members of the assembly have been established to examine (i) economic affairs, (ii) environment, (iii) corporate services, (iv) education and home affairs and (v) health, social security and housing. The real utility of the panels is said to be "that of independent critique which holds ministers to account and constructively engages with policy which is deficient".

According to constitutional convention United Kingdom legislation may be extended to Jersey by Order in Council at the request of the Island's government. Whether an Act of the United Kingdom Parliament may expressly apply to the Island as regards matters of self-government, or whether this historic power is now in abeyance, is a matter of legal debate. The States of Jersey Law 2005 established that no United Kingdom Act or Order in Council may apply to the Bailiwick without being referred to the States of Jersey.

Executive 

Previously, both executive and legislative powers were vested in a single body: the States of Jersey. A committee system managed government affairs and policy, with committees formed of States members. A report of a review committee chaired by Sir Cecil Clothier criticised this system of government, finding it incapable of developing high-level strategy, efficient policy coordination or effective political leadership.

The States of Jersey Law 2005 introduced a ministerial system of government. Executive powers are now vested in the Council of Ministers – formed of the Chief Minister and other ministers (all elected directly by the States). The council is the leading decision-making body of the wider Government of Jersey.

The Chief Minister is elected from among the elected members of the States. Ministers are then proposed both by the Chief Minister and any other elected member, the final decision being made by the States Assembly.

The overall direction of government as agreed by the Council of Ministers is published periodically as a "strategic plan", the current one being the Common Strategic Policy 2018 to 2022. These plans are debated and approved by the States Assembly and translated into action by a series of business plans for each department.

Cabinet collective responsibility among members of the Council of Ministers is a feature of the 2015 Code of Conduct for Ministers. However, ministers retain the right to present their own policy to the States in their capacity as a member of the assembly in domains not concerning Council policy.

In recent years, former Chief Executive Charlie Parker introduced a number of reforms to the government's administrative structure. Moving away from a system whereby each minister heads a single department, the One Government structure focuses on more efficient governmental organisation. As of 2022, the government departments are:

 Office of the Chief Executive
 Customer and Local Services
 Children, Young People, Education and Skills
 Health and Community Services
 Infrastructure, Housing and Environment
 Justice and Home Affairs
 Strategic Policy, Planning and Performance
 Treasury and Exchequer
 Economy
 Chief Operating Office

Political parties

Since the 1950s, politics in Jersey has been dominated by independent representatives. Historically, the island had two parties: the conservative Roses (Charlots) and the progressive Laurels (Magot). Due to the 2022 electoral reform, Jersey may be moving towards a politics dominated by parties. As of February 2022, there are four political parties in Jersey, which hold around a third of the States:

 Jersey Alliance (centre-right, party of government)
 Jersey Liberal Conservatives (centre-right)
 Reform Jersey (social democratic)
 Progress Party (centrist)

Criticism

Jersey's political system has often been criticised over the centuries, both within and without the island. The 'Jersey Way' is a term used in critiques to describe a political culture that enforces conformity, ignores perversion of the course of justice and suppresses political dissent. The Tax Justice Network states the Jersey Way allows for the island's political system to be abused by financial services sector companies.

The Tax Justice Network criticises the political system for its absence of judicial independence (due to 'close relations between the legal and financial services' and 'the intimate relations between legal professionals who grew up together'); lack of second chamber in its parliament (for scrutiny purposes); no political parties; no formalised government and opposition and the lack of a wide range of independent news sources, or research capabilities.

Criticism of the political system is no modern development. In the nineteenth century, Abraham Le Cras was an outspoken new resident of the island. A retired colonel, Le Cras was opposed to Jersey's historic self-government and represented a group of people who not only thought Jersey should be integrated into England fully, but disputed the right of the States to even make its own laws. He is noted as saying 'The States have no more power to make laws for Jersey than I have'. In 1840 he won a court case challenging the States' ability to naturalise people as citizens. The Privy Council determined that the long-standing precedent of the States doing so had been invalidated since Jersey had been ruled under civil law since 1771. In 1846, he persuaded the MP for Bath to push for a Parliamentary Committee to enquire into the law of Jersey, however HM Government instead promised a Royal Commission. The Commission advised the abolition of the Royal Court run by the Jurats and the replacement of it with three Crown-appointed judges and the introduction of a paid police force. Le Cras left the island to live in England in 1850.

Local government

Jersey is divided into twelve administrative districts known as parishes. All have access to the sea and are named after the saints to whom their ancient parish churches are dedicated.

The parishes of Jersey are further divided into vingtaines (or, in St. Ouen, cueillettes), divisions which are historic and nowadays mostly used for purposes of electoral constituency in municipal elections. These elections are held to elect the members of the Parish municipality. Each parish has an Honorary Police force of elected, unpaid civilians who exercise police and prosecution powers.

Jersey politicians

Separation debate 

The separation issue came up in the House of Commons in a debate on Jersey's constitution in 1969. According to Sir Cyril Black, Member of Parliament for Wimbledon, Jersey was on the verge of declaring independence from the British Government after the Queen's speech stated HM Government would examine the relationships with the Channel Islands. Jersey opposed its inclusion in the Royal Commission on the Constitution and the complete lack of consultation surrounding it. The Home Secretary later stated that there was no intention to change the relationship.

The question of Jersey's independence has been discussed from time to time in the States Assembly. In 1999, a member of the government said that 'Independence is an option open to the Island if the circumstances should justify this' but the government 'does not believe independence is appropriate in the present circumstances and does not see the circumstances arising in the foreseeable future when it would be appropriate'. In 2000, Senator Paul Le Claire called for a referendum on independence, a proposal which failed to win any significant support.

The Policy and Resources Committee of the States of Jersey established the Constitutional Review Group in July 2005, chaired by Sir Philip Bailhache, with terms of reference 'to conduct a review and evaluation of the potential advantages and disadvantages for Jersey in seeking independence from the United Kingdom or other incremental change in the constitutional relationship, while retaining the Queen as Head of State'.

Proposals for Jersey independence have subsequently been discussed at an international conference held in Jersey, organised by the Jersey and Guernsey Law Review. The former Bailiff, Sir Philip Bailhache has called for changes to the Channel Islands' relationship with the United Kingdom government, arguing that 'at the very least, we should be ready for independence if we are placed in a position where that course was the only sensible option'.

In October 2012, the Council of Ministers issued a "Common policy for external relations" that set out a number of principles for the conduct of external relations in accordance with existing undertakings and agreements. This document noted that Jersey "is a self-governing, democratic country with the power of self-determination" and "that it is not Government policy to seek independence from the United Kingdom, but rather to ensure that Jersey is prepared if it were in the best interests of Islanders to do so". On the basis of the established principles the Council of Ministers decided to "ensure that Jersey is prepared for external change that may affect the Island's formal relationship with the United Kingdom and/or European Union".

Constitutional Review Group report 

The Group's Second Interim Report was presented to the States by the Council of Ministers in June 2008. The report made a number of recommendations about Jersey independence, including the benefits and costs of independence and the social and cultural consequences. The island would need to be recognised as a sovereign state on a country by country basis. The report concluded that 'Jersey is equipped to face the challenges of independence' but 'whether those steps should be taken is not within the remit of this paper'.

At present the island is protected by the British Armed Forces. Upon independence the island would need to develop its own capacity to entirely handle defensive and security affairs. It established that Jersey could seek membership of a defensive alliance (e.g. NATO); negotiate a defence agreement with a sovereign state (e.g. the UK) - San Marino, for example have a defence agreement with Italy that cost 700,000 USD in 2000/01 - or establish an independent defence force (in a similar manner to Antigua and Barbuda, which spends around £2.5 million). Furthermore, it is unlikely that any major European power would allow the island to be invaded, but the island could not feasibly protect itself from a major external threat without securing defensive agreements.

Independence would require the establishment of a Foreign Affairs Department within the Government of Jersey, or other similar steps. At present, the island's international affairs are formally governed by the UK Government. The report recommended the island join 'essential' global organisations, such as the UN and IMF; the Commonwealth and the WTO. At the time, independence would have brought an end to Jersey's relationship with the EU, which was mediated through the UK's accession treaty protocol 3. The report suggests a minimum requirement of the establishment of three overseas missions: London, New York and Brussels (the Government has an office in London and shares an office in Brussels already), to provide contact with major organisations such as the Commonwealth, UN and EU, as well as the UK, US and EU, and also to allow use of them for tourism and trade-related purposes.

Consideration would need to be given to the questions of the internal organisation of Jersey's constitution, as well as citizenship and passports. The report assumes the Queen would continue to be the Head of State, appointing a Governor-General on the advice of the British Government. The report recommended the need for a codified constitution, which should contain a basic human rights statement. The current States Assembly could be replaced by a States Parliament, which would need to replace the checks and balances provided by the Privy Council.

Political pressure groups 

Jersey, as a polity predominated by independents has always had a number of pressure groups. Many ad-hoc lobby groups form in response to a single issue and then dissolve once the concerns have been dealt with. However, there are a number of pressure groups actively working to influence government decisions on a number of issues. For example, in 2012 the National Trust engaged in pressure campaign against development of the Plemont headland. The Trust was supported by the majority of the islands senior politicians, including the Chief Minister, but a proposition made in the States of Jersey for the States to compulsorily purchase the headland and sell it to the Trust was defeated in a vote on 13 December 2012. The outcome of the vote was 24 in favour of acquisition, 25 against, with one absent and one declaring an interest.

Interest Groups

The following groups are funded by their members.

Royal Jersey Agricultural and Horticultural Society
Institute of Directors, Jersey branch
Jersey Chamber of Commerce
Progress Jersey
Jersey Youth Reform Team
Jersey Rights Association
Same Difference
Save Jersey's Heritage
Société Jersiaise
Alliance Française, Jersey branch
Attac, Jersey Branch
National Trust for Jersey

Quangos

The following groups are, at least, partially funded by government. Appointments are made by the States Assembly.

Jersey Finance
Community Relations Trust
Jersey Overseas Aid
Jersey Consumer Council
Jersey Legal Information Board
 Jersey Development Company (formerly Jersey Waterfront Enterprise Board)

See also

Law of Jersey

References

Bibliography

Balleine's History of Jersey, Marguerite Syvret and Joan Stevens (1998) 

The Constitution of Jersey, Roy Le Herissier
Constitutional History of Jersey, F. de L. Bois, 1972

External links

States of Jersey Assembly
States of Jersey government
States of Jersey Scrutiny